Hoërskool Fichardtpark is a public Afrikaans medium co-educational high school situated in the suburb of Fichardtpark in Bloemfontein in the Free State province of South Africa, It is one of the top and most academic schools in the Free State.  It was founded in 1984.

The school is named after Fichardt Park, the suburb in which it is located.

Sports 
 Athletics
 Badminton
 Chess
 Cricket
 Cycling
 Flying
 Drum majorettes
 Duathlon
 Golf
 Gym
 Hockey
 Netball
 Rugby
 Tennis

Subjects 
 History
 Arts and Culture
 Afrikaans
 Business Studies
 Computer Application Technology
 Engineering Graphics and Design
 English
 Life Orientation
 Life Science
 Mathematics
 Mathematical Literacy
 Music
 Information Technology
 Physical Science
 Technology

References

External links 
 Official site 
 Teachers 
 School newspaper 

Schools in the Free State (province)
Afrikaans-language schools
Educational institutions established in 1984
1984 establishments in South Africa